Ruthanna Hopper (born December 5, 1972) is an American artist, author and curator.

Family 
A member of the Hopper family, her father was Dennis Hopper. A member of the Halprin family, her mother is Daria Halprin. Her grandparents are Anna and Lawrence Halprin.

Biography 
Hopper was born in Taos, New Mexico, the daughter of actor Dennis Hopper and actress Daria Halprin, and grew up in Marin County, California. She describes her upbringing as "bohemian". She has three paternal half-siblings (two sisters, one brother) and a maternal half-sibling (brother) with whom she was raised in Marin County. Hopper studied art at UC Davis and theater arts in New York.

In 2008, she co-wrote Celebutantes with Amanda Goldberg, daughter of producer Leonard Goldberg. The novel became a New York Times bestseller. In 2011, the follow-up novel Beneath a Starlet Sky was published by St. Martin's Press.

Hopper returned to her work in visual art in 2011 after release of her second novel. Her art practice is in the tradition of the Halprin work. Hopper is a visual artist and a curator.

References

External links 
 

1972 births
American film actresses
American film producers
American women writers
People from Taos, New Mexico
Living people
American women film producers
Jewish American actresses
21st-century American Jews
21st-century American women